Aloha is a tiny impact crater on the Moon, that lies to the northwest of the Montes Agricola ridge, on the Oceanus Procellarum. It is located near the faint terminus of a ray that crosses the mare from the southeast, originating at the crater Glushko.

References

External links
 

Impact craters on the Moon